Disfarmer is the 21st album by Bill Frisell to be released on the Nonesuch label. It features music written to accompany a retrospective of photographs taken by Mike Disfarmer.

Reception
The Allmusic review by Thom Jurek awarded the album 4 stars, stating, "the players are all excellent, but nobody here, not even Frisell, shines. Still, it is a pleasant recording to listen to if not hang on to. It floats and hovers about the room as a peaceful backdrop. Disfarmer is to be taken as a soundtrack rather than as a Frisell album proper, and listened to as a series of sketches rather than as a fully assembled statement from the artist".

Track listing
All compositions by Bill Frisell except as indicated.

 "Disfarmer Theme" – 5:37 
 "Lonely Man" – 1:15 
 "Lost, Night" – 1:50 
 "Farmer" – 1:03 
 "Focus" – 2:26 
 "Peter Miller's Discovery" – 4:43 
 "That's Alright, Mama" (Arthur Crudup) – 3:10 
 "Little Girl" – 3:42 
 "Little Boy" – 1:16 
 "No One Gets In" – 2:47 
 "Lovesick Blues" (Cliff Friend, Irving Mills) – 2:48 
 "I Can't Help It (If I'm Still in Love with You)" (Hank Williams" 3:50 
 "Shutter, Dream" (Bill Frisell, Viktor Krauss, Greg Leisz, Jenny Scheinman) – 4:26 
 "Exposed" – 2:12 
 "The Wizard" – 1:52 
 "Think" – 4:37 
 "Drink" – 4:29 
 "Play" – 1:32 
 "I Am Not a Farmer" – 3:36 
 "Small Town" – 1:00 
 "Arkansas Part 1" – 1:53 
 "Arkansas Part 2" – 2:19 
 "Arkansas Part 3" – 1:54 
 "Lost Again, Dark" – 2:06 
 "Natural Light" – 2:59 
 "Did You See Him?" – 2:06

Personnel
Bill Frisell – guitars
Greg Leisz – steel guitars, mandolin
Jenny Scheinman – violin
Viktor Krauss – bass

References 
 

2009 albums
Bill Frisell albums
Nonesuch Records albums